Storks is a baseball and softball team based in The Hague, The Netherlands. Storks' baseball team plays in the Honkbal Heren Hoofdklasse, the top level of baseball in the Netherlands. The club has also won three consecutive Dutch softball titles, winning the 2004, 2005 and 2006 Holland Series.

The club was founded with 12 members on one team in 1952. By 1956, the club was fielding 3 men's baseball teams and that year added its first woman's softball team. From 1970 to 1974, Wim Remmerswaal played for the Storks. In 1975, the team moved to its current field at the Kijkduincomplex. The Storks have played in the Hoofdklasse since 2018.

References

External links
 Official website

Baseball teams in the Netherlands
Softball teams in the Netherlands
Sports clubs in The Hague
1952 establishments in the Netherlands
Baseball teams established in 1952